Lewallen is a surname. Notable people with the surname include:

Jimmie Lewallen (1919–1995), American stock car racing driver
Kylie Shea Lewallen, American ballet dancer
The Lewallen Brothers:
Bobby Lewallen, American musician
Cal Lewallen Jr., American musician
Cal Lewallen Sr., American musician
Keith Lewallen, American musician
Tim Lewallen, American musician